Grand-Moulin is a light rail station that will be operated by the Réseau express métropolitain in Deux-Montagnes, Quebec, Canada. 

It was served by the Deux-Montagnes line.

History
The station opened in 1925 as the original Gare Deux-Montagnes. The station took on its present name in 1995 after the modernization of the Deux-Montagnes line was completed and a new Deux-Montagnes station was built close to boul. Deux-Montagnes.

Connecting bus routes

CIT Laurentides

References 

 Grand-Moulin Commuter Train Station Information (RTM)
 Grand-Moulin Commuter Train Station Schedule (RTM)

Former Exo commuter rail stations
Railway stations in Laurentides
Réseau express métropolitain railway stations